Jay Scott Greenspan (born September 23, 1959), known professionally as Jason Alexander, is an American actor, comedian, host and director. An Emmy and Tony winner, he is best known for his role as George Costanza in the television series Seinfeld (1989–1998), for which he was nominated for seven consecutive Primetime Emmy Awards and four Golden Globe Awards.

His other roles include Phillip Stuckey in the film Pretty Woman (1990), comic relief gargoyle Hugo in the Disney animated feature The Hunchback of Notre Dame (1996), and the title character in the animated series Duckman (1994–1997). He has made guest appearances on shows such as Dream On (1994), Curb Your Enthusiasm (2001, 2009), and The Marvelous Mrs. Maisel (2019). For his role in Dream On, he was nominated for a Primetime Emmy Award for Outstanding Guest Actor in a Comedy Series. He won the Daytime Emmy Award for Outstanding Original Song for "The Bad Guys?" on Brainwashed By Toons (2020).

Alexander made his Broadway debut originating the role of Joe in Stephen Sondheim's Merrily We Roll Along in 1981. He remained active on Broadway acting in the musicals The Rink in 1984, Personals in 1985, and the Neil Simon play Broadway Bound in 1986. He then starred in Jerome Robbins' Broadway in 1989, for which he won the Tony Award for Best Actor in a Musical. He appeared in the Los Angeles production of Mel Brooks' The Producers. He was the artistic director of "Reprise! Broadway's Best in Los Angeles", where he has directed musicals. From July 2023 he will make his Broadway directing debut with Sandy Rustin’s comedy The Cottage. The cast includes Eric McCormack, Laura Bell Bundy and Lilli Cooper.

Early life and education
Greenspan was born in Newark, New Jersey to a Jewish family, the son of Ruth Minnie (née Simon), a nurse and health care administrator, and Alexander B. Greenspan, an accounting manager. Greenspan later borrowed his father’s first name to create his stage name, Jason Alexander.

Alexander grew up in Maplewood and Livingston, New Jersey, and is a 1977 graduate of Livingston High School. Interested in magic from an early age, he initially hoped to be a magician, but while attending a magic camp was told that his hands were too small for card magic. He became interested in theater, eventually realizing, "Wait a minute—the whole thing's an illusion. Nothing up there is real" and that theater was "a magic trick". He then decided to pursue a theater career.

After high school, he studied theatre at Boston University. He wanted to pursue classical acting, but a professor redirected him toward comedy after noticing his physique, remarking, "I know your heart and soul are Hamlet, but you will never play Hamlet." Alexander left Boston University without a degree after his third year to take a full-time acting job in New York City. The university awarded him an honorary degree in 1995.

Career

Stage career
Alexander began his acting career on the New York stage and is an accomplished singer and dancer. On Broadway he appeared in Stephen Sondheim's Merrily We Roll Along, Kander & Ebb's The Rink, Neil Simon's Broadway Bound, Accomplice, and Jerome Robbins' Broadway, for which he garnered the 1989 Tony Award for Best Leading Actor in a Musical. In 2003, he was cast opposite Martin Short in the Los Angeles production of Mel Brooks's The Producers. He appeared with Kelsey Grammer in the 2004 musical adaptation of Charles Dickens's A Christmas Carol, as Jacob Marley. He continues to appear in live stage shows, including Barbra Streisand's memorable birthday party for Sondheim at the Hollywood Bowl, where he performed selections from Sweeney Todd: The Demon Barber of Fleet Street with Angela Lansbury. He was the artistic director of Reprise Theatre Company in Los Angeles, where he previously directed Sunday in the Park with George, and directed its 2007 revival of Damn Yankees. In 2015, he replaced Larry David as the lead in David's Broadway play Fish in the Dark. He co-starred opposite Sherie Rene Scott in the September 2017 world premiere of John Patrick Shanley's The Portuguese Kid at the Manhattan Theatre Club.

Television
Alexander is best known as one of the key cast members of the award-winning television sitcom Seinfeld, where he played the bumbling George Costanza (Jerry Seinfeld's character's best friend since childhood). He was nominated for seven Primetime Emmy Awards and four Golden Globe Awards for the role, but did not win any, mainly due to his co-star Michael Richards winning for his role as Cosmo Kramer. He did, however, win the 1995 Screen Actors Guild Award for Outstanding Performance by a Male Actor in a Comedy Series.

Before Seinfeld, Alexander appeared in commercials for John Deere and McDonald's and in the short-lived CBS sitcom Everything's Relative (1987). Concurrently with his Seinfeld role, he voiced the lead character in the animated series Duckman (1994–1997) and voiced Catbert, the evil director of human resources, in the short-lived animated series Dilbert, based on the popular comic strip.

Alexander made cameo appearances as himself in the second season of Curb Your Enthusiasm, and he appeared in the show's seventh season with his three principal Seinfeld co-stars. He had a part in the ABC sitcom Dinosaurs as Al "Sexual" Harris (who frequently engaged in sexual harassment) as well as other characters. Despite a successful career in film and stage, Alexander did not repeat his Seinfeld-level of success in television. The year 2001 marked his first post-Seinfeld return to prime-time television: the heavily promoted but short-lived ABC sitcom Bob Patterson, which was canceled after five episodes. Alexander partially blames the show's failure on the country's mood after 9/11.

Alexander's second chance as a TV series lead, the CBS sitcom Listen Up! (2004–05), also fell short of a second season. Alexander was the principal executive producer of the series, based very loosely on the life of the popular sports-media personality Tony Kornheiser. Alexander appeared on the Family Guy: Live in Vegas CD and sang a verse in a song. He was featured in the Friends episode "The One Where Rosita Dies" as Earl, a suicidal supply manager. Phoebe calls him trying to sell him toner, learns about his problem, and tries to persuade him not to commit suicide. This is referenced in an episode of Malcolm in the Middle where Alexander appears as Leonard, a neurotic and critical loner. He describes himself as "free" and says he makes money "selling toner over the phone". Later in the episode, he is repeatedly harassed by a man named George. Alexander appeared in the 1995 TV version of the Broadway musical Bye Bye Birdie, as Conrad Birdie's agent, Albert Peterson. He guest-starred in episode 8 of the 1996 variety show Muppets Tonight.

In 1999, Alexander presided over the New York Friars Club Roast event honoring Jerry Stiller, who played his father on Seinfeld; it featured appearances by Kevin James and Patton Oswalt, both Stiller's costars on The King of Queens.

Alexander appeared in the Star Trek: Voyager episode "Think Tank" as Kurros, a genius alien trying to get Seven of Nine to serve on his ship. He appeared in "One Night at Mercy", the first episode of the short-lived 2002 revival of The Twilight Zone, playing Death. He featured in the 2005 Monk episode "Mr. Monk and the Other Detective" as Monk's rival, Marty Eels. On the June 26, 2006, episode of Jimmy Kimmel Live!, Alexander demonstrated several self-defense techniques. He hosted the July 4, 2006, PBS "A Capitol Fourth" celebrations in Washington, D.C., singing, dancing, and playing tuned drums. In 2006, Alexander signed on to feature as a regular cast member in the second season of Everybody Hates Chris. He hosted the Comedy Central Roast of William Shatner on August 13, 2006 (first airdate: August 20, 2006). In 2007, Alexander was a guest star in the third episode of the improv comedy series Thank God You're Here. He has been a frequent guest and panelist on Bill Maher's Politically Incorrect and Real Time; Hollywood Squares; the Late Late Show, with both Craig Kilborn and Craig Ferguson; and Late Show with David Letterman.

In 2008, Alexander guest-starred in the season four episode "Masterpiece" of the CBS show Criminal Minds as Professor Rothschild, a well-educated serial killer obsessed with the Fibonacci sequence who sends the team into a race against time to save his last victims. He returned in the same season to direct the episode "Conflicted", featuring the actor Jackson Rathbone. In 2011, Alexander was the guest star in an episode of Harry's Law, playing a high school teacher bringing a wrongful dismissal suit.

In 2018, Alexander played Olix the bartender in The Orville. The same year, he portrayed Gene Lundy, a drama teacher, on two episodes of Young Sheldon. In 2020, 2021 and 2022, he reprised the role of Gene Lundy on one episode.

In 2019, Alexander appeared on The Marvelous Mrs. Maisel as Asher Friedman, a blacklisted Broadway playwright who is an old friend of Midge Maisel's father Abe Weissman.

Films
In addition to his roles as an insensitive, money-hungry lawyer in Pretty Woman and as inept womanizer Mauricio in Shallow Hal, Alexander has appeared in Love! Valour! Compassion!, Dunston Checks In, Love and Action in Chicago, The Last Supper, and Jacob's Ladder. He voiced the gargoyle Hugo in Disney's 1996 animated film The Hunchback of Notre Dame and its direct-to-video sequel, The Hunchback of Notre Dame II. His other Disney voice work includes House of Mouse and the video game Kingdom Hearts 3D: Dream Drop Distance. He has dabbled in directing, starting with 1996's For Better or Worse and 1999's Just Looking. He played the toymaker A.C. Gilbert in the 2002 movie The Man Who Saved Christmas. In 2009, Alexander had a small role in the movie Hachi: A Dog's Tale as a train station manager. He starred as Cosmo in A Fairly Odd Movie: Grow Up, Timmy Turner!.

Alexander voiced the character Abis Mal in The Return of Jafar and the TV series based on the 1992 film Aladdin. In 2009, he played Joseph in the Thomas Nelson audio Bible production The Word of Promise. The project featured a large ensemble of actors, including Jim Caviezel, Lou Gossett Jr., John Rhys-Davies, Jon Voight, Gary Sinise, Christopher McDonald, Marisa Tomei, and John Schneider.

Commercial work
Alexander starred in several commercials during the 1980s. Among them were commercials for Hershey's Kiss; Delta Gold potato chips; Miller Lite beer; McDonald's McDLT hamburger; Pabst Blue Ribbon beer; Levi's 501 jeans; Sony Watchman TV; and Western Union wire transfer. In January 1995, he did a commercial for Rold Gold pretzels to be broadcast during the Super Bowl. The commercial depicts him with Frasier dog Eddie jumping out of an airplane with a parachute over the stadium. After the commercial, the audience is brought back to a supposedly live feed of the playing field hearing startled sports commentators as Alexander and the dog land in the field to wild applause. He appeared in Kentucky Fried Chicken (KFC) commercials in 2002, including one with Barry Bonds of the San Francisco Giants and another with Trista Rehn of The Bachelorette. It was rumored that he quit doing these commercials due to KFC suppliers and slaughterhouses' alleged cruelty to animals, but he denied that in the August 2, 2006, issue of Adweek, saying, "That's PETA bullcrap. I loved working for KFC. I was targeted by PETA to broker something between them. I think KFC really stepped up to the plate; unfortunately PETA did not." In 2007, Alexander appeared in a commercial for the ASPCA that aired on cable TV stations.  In 2018, Alexander became one of several celebrities to play Colonel Sanders in commercials for KFC, reprising his role from the 2002 campaign.

Standup/host 
Alexander hosted the LOL Sudbury opening night gala in Sudbury, Ontario, Canada on May 29, 2008, which was simulcast throughout Canada at 60 Cineplex theaters, a first for any comedy festival. He has lent his voice to several episodes of the Twilight Zone Radio Dramas.

In 2008 and again in 2009, Alexander fronted Jason Alexander's Comedy Spectacular, a routine exclusive to Australia. The show consists of stand-up and improvisation and incorporates Alexander's musical talent. He is backed up by several well-known Australian comedians. His first time performing a similar show of this nature was in 2006's Jason Alexander's Comedy Christmas. In February/March 2010, Alexander starred in his show, The Donny Clay Experience, at the Planet Hollywood Resort in Las Vegas, Nevada. Donny Clay, whom he has portrayed in a tour of the United States and Orillia, Ontario, is a self-help guru in a similar mold to his Bob Patterson character.

In 2020, Alexander hosted the Saturday Night Seder, an online Passover Seder that featured many celebrities and benefited the CDC Foundation. From February 2023 he will co-present 'Really? No, Really?', a weekly podcast in which he, co-host Peter Tilden, and their guests will attempt to find answers "to life’s most baffling, intriguing, confusing and annoying questions".

Magic interests 

Alexander performed a mentalism and magic act at The Magic Castle in Hollywood, California, from April 24 to 30, 2006, and he was later named The Academy of Magical Arts Parlor Magician of the Year for this act. He won the Academy's Junior Achievement Award in 1989.

Charity 
Alexander was the national spokesman for the Scleroderma Foundation, a leading organization dedicated to raising awareness of the disease and assisting those who are afflicted. In summer 2005, he appeared with Lee Iacocca in ads for DaimlerChrysler. Iacocca did the ads as part of a way to raise money for Denise Faustman's research on autoimmunity. Iacocca and Alexander both have loved ones whose lives have been adversely affected by autoimmunity.

More recently, Alexander has competed on televised poker shows and in various tournaments. He appeared twice on Bravo's Celebrity Poker Showdown, winning the final table of the 8th season. Alexander won the $500,000 prize for the charity of his choice, The United Way of America, to help benefit the New Orleans area. Alexander played in the 2007 World Series of Poker main event, but he was eliminated on the second day. He returned in 2009, making it to day 3 of the event and finishing in the top 30% of the field. Alexander has appeared on NBC's Poker After Dark in the "Celebrities and Mentors" episode, finishing in 6th place after being eliminated by professional poker player Gavin Smith. He signed with PokerStars, where he plays under the screen name "J. Alexander". In 2021, Alexander competed in a virtual National Poker Tournament, hosted by the Children's Tumor Foundation, to raise money for Neurofibromatosis research.

Political activism
Alexander has been a prominent public supporter of the OneVoice initiative, which seeks out opinions from moderate Israelis and Palestinians who want to achieve a mutual peace agreement. On Real Time with Bill Maher, he said he had visited Israel many times and spoke about progress toward peace he had observed.

Alexander is a supporter of the Democratic Party. Alexander supports gay marriage and the assault weapons ban. In 2020, he campaigned for the Texas Democrats with former Seinfeld colleagues Julia Louis-Dreyfus and Larry David. He endorsed Barack Obama in 2012 and Joe Biden in 2020. Alexander has been an outspoken critic of the Trump administration and he has ridiculed Donald Trump over his dancing. He has called Republican senator Ted Cruz a "jerk", referencing a joke from Seinfeld.

Personal life
Alexander has been married to Daena E. Title, cousin of director Stacy Title, since May 31, 1982. They have two sons, Gabriel and Noah.

Filmography

Film

Television

Music videos

Video games

Theme parks

Director

Stage

Awards and nominations

Tony Awards

Primetime Emmy Awards

Daytime Emmy Awards

Golden Globe Awards

Screen Actors Guild Award

References

External links

 
 
 
 
 
 A 1999 Interview about his 1981 Broadway role in Merrily We Roll Along
 

1959 births
Living people
20th-century American comedians
20th-century American Jews
20th-century American male actors
21st-century American comedians
21st-century American Jews
21st-century American male actors
American magicians
American male comedians
American male film actors
American male musical theatre actors
American male television actors
American male video game actors
American male voice actors
American sketch comedians
American television directors
Audiobook narrators
Boston University College of Fine Arts alumni
Comedians from New Jersey
Drama Desk Award winners
Jewish American comedians
Jewish American male actors
Jewish American male comedians
Livingston High School (New Jersey) alumni
Male actors from New Jersey
Male actors from Newark, New Jersey
New Jersey Democrats
New Jersey Hall of Fame inductees
Outstanding Performance by a Male Actor in a Comedy Series Screen Actors Guild Award winners
People from Livingston, New Jersey
People from Newark, New Jersey
Tony Award winners
Academy of Magical Arts Junior Achievement Award winners
Academy of Magical Arts Parlour Magician of the Year winners